The Saba National Marine Park encompasses the waters and sea bed encircling the Caribbean island of Saba, Kingdom of the Netherlands, from the high water mark to  deep. At the time of its creation in 1987, the government passed the Marine Environment Ordinance to protect the coral reefs and other marine life within the park. The Saba Conservation Foundation manages the Saba National Marine Park, as well as the island's hyperbaric facility and natural sites on land.

Protection
A number of regulations ensure that the park's thriving aquatic life remains healthy. Zones divide the area according to acceptable uses. Commercial fishing is forbidden in certain places to prevent overfishing. The reefs are protected from damage by 36 permanently anchored buoys where boats can moor. Scuba divers are not permitted to dive by themselves; they must dive with guides from one of Saba's three dive shops.

Protecting the Saba National Marine Park is not only an environmental consideration, it is also an economic concern. Tourism currently brings in more money to the island than any other industry, and the Saba National Marine Park is the biggest tourist draw.

Geography
In addition to the fact that Saba's reefs are still flourishing, unlike many others in the region, several unusual natural formations attract divers. In the Ladder Bay area, a natural labyrinth was created by flowing lava. Other attractions include underwater caves, tunnels, and rock walls.

Fauna

Many different species of life inhabit Saba National Marine Park. Soft corals abound. Hard corals live only in the waters on the island's east side. Types of fish found in the park include parrotfish, Atlantic blue tang, black durgon, and barracuda. Sharks and stingrays frequent certain areas. Octopus, turtles, and spiny lobster make the park their home also.

Visiting
Saba's residents may access the park without charge. Visitors pay $5 (US) per dive (in addition to dive shop diving fees). The park fee supports maintenance of the park and its equipment.

See also
 Saba Conservation Foundation

References

External links
Saba Conservation Foundation website

Nature conservation in the Netherlands
Geography of Saba (island)